Valeri Ivanovich Shikunov (born 28 October 1968) is a former Russian professional football player.

Club career
He played for the main squad of PFC CSKA Moscow in the USSR Federation Cup.

Shikunov scored one of the goals as FC Asmaral Moscow became the first club to score more than seven goals in a Russian Top League match, thrashing FC Zenit Saint Petersburg 8–3 during the 1992 season.

Honours
 Soviet Top League champion: 1989.
 USSR Federation Cup winner: 1987.

References

External links
 

1968 births
Footballers from Moscow
Living people
Soviet footballers
Russian footballers
Association football defenders
FC Dynamo Moscow reserves players
Soviet Top League players
Russian Premier League players
FC Spartak Moscow players
PFC CSKA Moscow players
FC SKA Rostov-on-Don players
FC Asmaral Moscow players
FC Chernomorets Novorossiysk players